The mayor of Hamilton is the head of the municipal government of Hamilton, New Zealand, and presides over the Hamilton City Council.

The incumbent is Paula Southgate, who was first elected in the 2019 local government elections.

History
Hamilton had East and West Town Boards until it was constituted under the Municipal Corporations Act 1876 on 24 December 1877 as a Borough Council, with a mayor. Mayoral elections were originally held annually but have been triennial since 1935. Elections were initially held in December, in April or May from 1901–1947, and have most recently taken place in October.

In 1989, Evans was the first woman to be elected Mayor of Hamilton. Following her retirement in 1998, all subsequent incumbents were defeated at their next election until Julie Hardaker's 2013 re-election.

List

References

Sources 
 Gibbons, P.J. (1977), Astride the River. Published for the Hamilton City Council by Whitcoulls Limited, pp317–318 and Hamilton City Council Annual Plans.
 Hamilton City Council Annual Statement of Accounts and Waikato Times index at Hamilton City Libraries.

Hamilton
Politics of Hamilton, New Zealand